Dønttinden is a mountain in Rauma Municipality in Møre og Romsdal county, Norway. The European route E136 highway passes just north of the mountain.

See also
List of mountains of Norway

References

Mountains of Møre og Romsdal
Rauma, Norway